"The City Coat of Arms" (German: "Das Stadtwappen") is a short story by Franz Kafka. It was published posthumously in Beim Bau der Chinesischen Mauer (Berlin, 1931). The first English translation by Willa and Edwin Muir was published by Martin Secker in London in 1933. It appeared in The Great Wall of China. Stories and Reflections (New York City: Schocken Books, 1946).

Plot
The short story details the creation of the Tower of Babel. The narrator notes how many different people, from various nationalities had a hand in the construction. The massive scale of the project creates so many logistical and societal complications that it becomes impossible for civilization to ever achieve the original plan, or to even seriously believe in the plan.  But the project continues on in an insincere manner, because everybody is too deeply involved to be able to leave.

Analysis
The story can be interpreted as Kafka's criticism of the layers of bureaucracy that follow projects, as well as his reaction to the changing city he lived in at the time. Kafka lived in Prague, which had a large tower constructed by many workers and large funds yet was condemned. While some scholars have noted the story's relevance to elements in the Torah, others have noted Kafka's use of realism, utilized by earlier writers such as Stephen Crane Kafka noted the piece in at least one of his letters, and claimed it was inspired by his study of the Midrash and the rising pollution he noted in Prague.

References

Short stories by Franz Kafka
Short stories published posthumously
Tower of Babel